Colorado Murray (born 23 January 1995) is a Jamaican footballer who currently plays for Waterhouse of the National Premier League.

Career

Club
In August 2020 Murray signed with Waterhouse.

International
In February 2019 Murray was invited to train with the Jamaican senior team. He made his international debut for the Reggae Boyz in a friendly against Bermuda on 11 March 2020.

References

1995 births
Living people
Jamaican footballers
Jamaica international footballers
Association football forwards
Tivoli Gardens F.C. players
Waterhouse F.C. players